Las Tres Gracias (English: "The Three Graces") is a sculptural group by Sergio Garval, installed in Guadalajara, in the Mexican state of Jalisco.

References

Outdoor sculptures in Guadalajara